Francis Moze (born 2 February 1946) is a French bass player and pianist, best known for his work in Magma, Gong and Pierre Moerlen's Gong.

Moze played in an early line-up with Magma. When he left the group, Giorgio Gomelsky introduced him to Gong. He played on the album Flying Teapot (1973). He re-joined what had by then become Pierre Moerlen's Gong for the Gazeuse! (1976) album (in the U.S., it was called Expresso).

After Pierre Moerlen's departure, Moze stayed in London, joining Peter Lemer's trio, also with Laurie Allan on drums. In the late 1980s, John Greaves (playing keyboards), Pip Pyle (drums) and Moze formed a short-lived band.

External sources
 Calyx history of Gong
 Line-up history of Magma

Canterbury scene
Living people
French bass guitarists
Male bass guitarists
Progressive rock bass guitarists
Magma (band) members
Gong (band) members
1946 births
French male guitarists